Club Esportiu Constància (Club Deportivo Constancia in Spanish) is a Spanish football team based in Inca, Majorca, in the autonomous community of the Balearic Islands. Founded in 1922 it plays in Tercera División, holding home games at Nou Camp d'Inca with a capacity of 10,000 seats.

History 
On 2 December 1922 the society of "Socorros Mutuos La Constancia" founded its own club: the Constancia Foot-ball Club (popularly known as La Constancia).

Season to season

11 seasons in Segunda División
3 seasons in Segunda División B
60 seasons in Tercera División
9 seasons in Divisiones Regionales

Honours
Tercera División: 1940–41, 1961–62, 1982–83, 1983–84, 1996–97, 1998–99, 2004–05, 2011–12
Categorías Regionales: 1952–53, 1971–72

Notable former players
 Vernon De Marco
 Tomeu Llompart
 Pedro Mairata
 José Luis Rondo
 Adrián Salcedo

Stadium
The Nou Camp d'Inca was inaugurated on 29 August 1965, with a capacity of 10,000 seats. The surface of the playing field is natural grass, and has a size of 105x67 meters.

References

External links
Official website 
FFIB team profile 
Futbolme team profile 

 
Football clubs in the Balearic Islands
Sport in Mallorca
Association football clubs established in 1922
Inca, Spain
1922 establishments in Spain